Congenital cataracts are a lens opacity which is present at birth. Congenital cataracts occur in a broad range of severity: some lens opacities do not progress and are visually insignificant, others can produce profound visual impairment.

Congenital cataracts may be unilateral or bilateral. They can be classified by morphology, presumed or defined genetic cause, presence of specific metabolic disorders, or associated ocular anomalies or systemic findings.

Signs and symptoms

Congenital cataracts occur in a variety of morphologic configurations, including lamellar, polar, sutural, coronary, cerulean, nuclear, capsular, complete, membranous.

Cause

In general, approximately one-third of congenital cataracts are a component of a more extensive syndrome or disease (e.g., cataract resulting from congenital rubella syndrome), one-third occur as an isolated inherited trait, and one-third result from undetermined causes. Metabolic diseases tend to be more commonly associated with bilateral cataracts.

Genetics
Approximately 50% of all congenital cataract cases may have a genetic cause which is quite heterogeneous. It is known that different mutations in the same gene can cause similar cataract patterns, while the highly variable morphologies of cataracts within some families suggest that the same mutation in a single gene can lead to different phenotypes. More than 25 loci and genes on different chromosomes have been associated with congenital cataract. Mutations in distinct genes, which encode the main cytoplasmic proteins of human lens, have been associated with cataracts of various morphologies, including genes encoding crystallins (CRYA, CRYB, and CRYG), lens specific connexins (Cx43, Cx46, and Cx50), major intrinsic protein (MIP) or Aquaporin, cytoskeletal structural proteins, paired-like homeodomain transcription factor 3 (PITX3), avian musculoaponeurotic fibrosarcoma (MAF), and heat shock transcription factor 4 (HSF4).

Diagnosis
All newborns should have screening eye examinations, including an evaluation of the red reflexes. 
 The red reflex test is best performed in a darkened room and involves shining a bright direct ophthalmoscope into both eyes simultaneously from a distance of 1– 2 ft. This test can be used for routine ocular screening by nurses, pediatricians, family practitioners, and optometrists. 
 Retinoscopy through the child's undilated pupil is helpful for assessing the potential visual significance of an axial lens opacity in a pre-verbal child. Any central opacity or surrounding cortical distortion greater than 3 mm can be assumed to be visually significant.
 Laboratory Tests : In contrast to unilateral cataracts, bilateral congenital cataracts may be associated with many systemic and metabolic diseases. A basic laboratory evaluation for bilateral cataracts of unknown cause in apparently healthy children includes:

 - Urine test for reducing substance, galactose 1-phosphate uridyltransferase, galactokinase, amino acids
 - Infectious diseases: TORCH and varicella titers, VDRL
 - Serum calcium, phosphorus, glucose and ferritin

Treatment

Surgery

In general, the younger the child, the greater the urgency in removing the cataract, because of the risk of amblyopia. For optimal visual development in newborns and young infants, a visually significant unilateral congenital cataract should be detected and removed before age 6 weeks, and visually significant bilateral congenital cataracts should be removed before age 10 weeks.

Some congenital cataracts are too small to affect vision, therefore no surgery or treatment will be done. If they are superficial and small, an ophthalmologist will continue to monitor them throughout a patient's life. Commonly, a patient with small congenital cataracts that do not affect vision will eventually be affected later in life; generally this will take decades to occur.

Epidemiology
 Congenital cataracts are responsible for nearly 10% of all vision loss in children worldwide.
 Congenital cataracts are one of the most common treatable causes of visual impairment and blindness during infancy, with an estimated prevalence of 1 to 6 cases per 10,000 live births.

References

External links 

Eye
Vision
Ophthalmology
Blindness
Disorders of lens